Care Bears: Share Bear Shines is a 2010 American computer-animated adventure film featuring the Care Bear Power Team.  The film was produced by SD Entertainment and Shari Lewis Enterprises, who also made 2007's Care Bears: Oopsy Does It!.

Cast
 Tracey Moore - Share Bear
 Anna Cummer - Princess Starglow
 Tabitha St. Germain - Cheer Bear
 Ashleigh Ball - Oopsy Bear
 Ian James Corlett - Funshine Bear
 Scott McNeil - Grumpy Bear

Plot
The sunshine in Care-a-Lot is at stake when Princess Starglow, the princess of the stars, decides to shut down all of star related things forever.

Release
Share Bear Shines premiered on DVD in Australia on March 10, 2010, through Magna Pacific. In the United States, the film had a limited released to theaters on August 15, as part of Kidtoon Films' matinee program, and was released on DVD through Lionsgate on November 6, 2010.

References

External links
 

American direct-to-video films
2010s American animated films
2010 computer-animated films
2010 direct-to-video films
2010 films
American children's animated fantasy films
American computer-animated films
Share Bear Shines
Direct-to-video animated films
Direct-to-video sequel films
Films directed by Davis Doi
Lionsgate animated films
2010s children's animated films
2010s English-language films